Gypsophila oldhamiana, the Manchurian baby's-breath or Oldham's baby's-breath, is a flowering plant of the family Caryophyllaceae.

References 

oldhamiana